Edward Wise may refer to:

 Edward Wise (judge) (1818–1865), judge of the Supreme Court of New South Wales
 Edward Wise (died 1675) (1632–1675), English politician who sat in the House of Commons at various times between 1659 and 1675
 Frank Wise (British politician) (Edward Frank Wise, 1885–1933), British economist, civil servant and politician